Pyrogi is a village in the Nicosia District of Cyprus, located south of Tymbou. It is under de facto control of Northern Cyprus. Today it is largely uninhabited, as the village lies within military area and can only be visited with permission of the Turkish military. In 1960 the village had 460 inhabitants. One kilometre northwest of the town lies the also uninhabited former village of Margo.

References

Communities in Nicosia District
Populated places in Lefkoşa District
Greek Cypriot villages depopulated during the 1974 Turkish invasion of Cyprus
Former populated places in Cyprus